Max Kämpf (1912–1982) was a Swiss painter.

References

This article was initially translated from the German Wikipedia.

20th-century Swiss painters
Swiss male painters
1912 births
1982 deaths
20th-century Swiss male artists